Juhan Simm ( in Kivilõppe – 20 December 1959 in Tartu) was an Estonian composer, conductor and choir director.

Juhan Simm was born in Kivilõppe village, Vana-Suislepa Parish, Kreis Fellin, Governorate of Livonia, Russian Empire. He attended the village school in Suislepa and the parish school in Tarvastu. He studied from 1906 to 1910 at the Faculty of Physics and Mathematics at the University of Tartu. Early on he discovered his passion for music. In 1908 he founded the Tartu male choir. From 1912, he was a conductor of choirs. From 1912 to 1914 he studied conducting at the Stern Conservatory in Berlin with Alexander von Fielitz and composition with Wilhelm Klatte and Julius Stern. In 1924 he perfected his skills in conducting at the Grand Opéra in Paris.

From 1906 to 1910 Juhan Simm was employed in the theatre and concert hall Vanemuine in Tartu. From 1914 to 1916 he was musical director at the Vanemuine theatre, 1916–1925 Head of the local male choir and conductor from 1916 to 1940. 1926/27 and from 1944 to 1951, Simm taught conducting, music education and music theory at the Music School of Tartu. He founded and led several choirs in Estonia.

Juhan Simm was the head of the Estonian Song Festival of 1923, 1933, 1938, 1947 and 1950. 1947 "submitted the title of People's Artist of the Estonian Soviet Socialist Republic "award.

In addition, Juhan Simm was a music critic and composer of numerous works for orchestra and choir singing. He stayed in his work of the Estonian national romantic in nature.

Selected works
1910 "Laul orjadele" (cantata for baritone, mixed chorus and symphony orchestra, text Gustav Suits)
1911 "Hommik" (for male choir and symphony orchestra, text Kalevipoeg)
1912 "Kalevipoeg isa haual" (for male choir and symphony orchestra, text Kalevipoeg)
1914 Overture for Symphony Orchestra
1915 "Kosjasõit" (musical comedy, text August Kitzberg)
1915 "Kooparüütel" (operetta, libretto by Karl August Hindrey)
1917 Eelkevad "(cantata for men's and mixed choir, text Karl Eduard Sööt) (2nd version 1958)
1932 Koidula "(Overture for Symphony Orchestra) 
1945 Overture for Symphony Orchestra 
1950 Suite Estonian ways for symphony orchestra
1952 Overture for Symphony Orchestra 
1957 Quartet for Strings

For male choir:
"Oma saar" (Text Gustav Suits)
"Lauljate teretus" (Text Mihkel Veske)

For mixed choir:
"Oh, and tule" (Text Anna Haava)

External links
Directory of works
Kurzlebenslauf (Estonian)
Oma saar (.mp3)

1885 births
1959 deaths
People from Viljandi Parish
People from Kreis Fellin
Estonian conductors (music)
20th-century Estonian composers
20th-century conductors (music)
Hugo Treffner Gymnasium alumni
University of Tartu alumni
People's Artists of the Estonian Soviet Socialist Republic